Tanque Verde Unified School District 13  is a school district in Pima County, Arizona.

References

External links
 

School districts in Pima County, Arizona